The Nokia Asha series was a range of low-end 
feature phones and smartphones produced and marketed by Nokia. The name "Asha" came from the Hindi word meaning "hope".

On 3 September 2013, Microsoft announced its purchase of Nokia's mobile device business, with the deal closing on 25 April 2014. The company previously announced an intent to use Asha as an "on-ramp" to the Windows Phone platform, but in a company memo released in July 2014, it was announced that as part of cutbacks, Microsoft would end the Asha and Android-based Nokia X range entirely, in favor of solely producing Lumia Windows Phones and Nokia-branded "feature phone" products.

On 11 January 2018, HMD Global acquired the Asha brand name.

List of devices
Below are the mobile phones in the Asha range. None of the Asha models have GPS functionality. All Asha phones included an FM radio.

The Asha 305 and Asha 311 models are known as the first generation of Asha Full Touch phones; the second generation is the Asha 50x line.
All devices up to the Asha 50x series run the Nokia domestic operating system with Series 40 UI platform, also known as S40. The Asha 501 (released in May 2013), Asha 500, Asha 502, Asha 503 and Asha 230 (announced on 14 February 2014) are powered by the Nokia Asha platform, which builds on S40 and Smarterphone.

Feature phones without the Asha name powered by S40

The Nokia 206, 207, 208, and 301 were not part of the Asha series as they do not carry the "Asha" branding, despite mistakenly being marketed as such by some carriers and retailers.

Asha on Linux project

According to The Verge, Nokia had a project referred to as Asha on Linux and also as "MView"—a reference to Mountain View. The project used a fork of Android on a low-end handset to maximize margins. The project resulted in the Nokia X family of devices, unveiled at MWC 2014. It was one of two known Android projects at the company, the other was running the OS on high-end Lumia hardware.

See also
 Nokia N9
 Nokia X
 Microsoft Lumia
 Symbian
 Nokia 1

References

External links

Nokia smartphones
Nokia phones by series
Asha series (Nokia ASeries)
Mobile phones introduced in the 2010s